The 2021–22 Cypriot Cup was the 80th edition of the Cypriot Cup. A total of 23 clubs entered the competition. It began in September 2021 with the first round and concluded on 25 May 2022 with the final held at the GSP Stadium. Omonia FC won the Cup for the 15th time and qualified for the 2022–23 Europa League play-off round.

First round 
The first round draw took place on 31 August 2021.

|colspan="5" style="background-color:#D0D0D0" align=center|22 September 2021

|-
|colspan="5" style="background-color:#D0D0D0" align=center|29 September 2021

Second round 
 

 

|}

Quarter-finals 

 
 
      

|}

Semi-finals 

 
 

|}

Final

See also	
 2021–22 Cypriot First Division	
 2021–22 Cypriot Second Division

References

External links 
 
Soccerway.com

	

Cup
Cyprus
Cypriot Cup seasons